The A90 road is a major north to south road in eastern Scotland, running from Edinburgh to Fraserburgh, through Dundee and Aberdeen. Along with the A9 and the A82 it is one of the three major north–south trunk roads connecting the Central Belt to the North.

Background
The creation and development of the A90 road has to be understood in terms of the development of the economy of the North-East of Scotland which had resulted in an increase in traffic along the route between Perth and Aberdeen. In recognition of this, in 1979, the British government announced that it was giving priority to the upgrading of the route to dual carriageway standard. It had already been decided that the trunk route between Dundee and Stonehaven which, previously, had followed the same route as the railway line between the two towns, would now follow an inland route through Forfar and Laurencekirk. The new route would incorporate the A85 from Perth to Dundee the A929 between Dundee and Forfar, the A94 between Forfar and Stonehaven, and the A92 from Stonehaven to Aberdeen; in 1994, the confusion of numbers was resolved with the renumbering of these roads and the creation of the A90 (M90) Edinburgh to Aberdeen trunk road. The coastal route from Dundee to Stonehaven was detrunked in 1978, at the same time as the inland route was trunked.

History 
In 1994, it was stated that £139 million had been spent since 1979 on upgrades to the then-A90 between Perth and Aberdeen (the section between Stonehaven and Aberdeen has since become part of the A92).

A grade-separated junction at Longforgan was opened in 1996.

The section of the A90 between Balmedie and Tipperty was upgraded to dual carriageway in 2018. On 3 September 2018, the former section of the A90 between Stonehaven and Blackdog was renumbered A92 in preparation for the opening of the Aberdeen Western Peripheral Route, which became the new route of the A90.

Route
From Edinburgh, the A90 travels west and connects to the M90 motorway bypass route that leads to the M9: however, it is only possible to travel northbound when reaching this connection. After connecting with the M90, it runs as a short section of A-road before turning into the M90 properly at the Queensferry Crossing. At Perth, the M90 again becomes the A90, now running north east to Dundee and through the Kingsway road system. It then passes Forfar, Brechin and Stracathro.

After crossing the Cowie Water just north of Stonehaven, a new (2019) junction takes the A90 road north as part of the Aberdeen Western Peripheral Route (AWPR), bypassing the city to its west past the suburban developments of Peterculter, Milltimber, Westhill and Kingswells, turning east past Aberdeen Airport and Dyce. Meanwhile, while the road previously known as the A90 continues as the renamed A92 via Newtonhill, Portlethen, Cove Bay, the urban area of Aberdeen and Bridge of Don), rejoining the A90 at the village of Blackdog where the AWPR terminates. Proceeding north, the route crosses the Ythan Estuary near Ellon, skirting Peterhead (and crossing Balmoor Bridge) on its way to Fraserburgh. The A952 road via Mintlaw serves as one of Aberdeenshire's principal freight routes.

The Dundee to Aberdeen stretch of the A90 has many speed cameras. Previously, the  trip from Dundee to Aberdeen along the A90 entailed over a dozen speed cameras including a majority of fixed Gatso types as well as locations used by mobile camera vans. These cameras were found on long fast stretches of road, and shortly before dangerous junctions, such as at the Laurencekirk junction where a  speed limit is in force. This was introduced due to this junction's appalling safety record. A similar speed restriction was imposed at Forfar until two new grade-separated junctions were built, after which the restriction was lifted. In 2017 Average Speed Cameras were erected between Dundee and Stonehaven, with 15 per side, spaced approximately every 5 miles for a total of 30 cameras. BBC News reported in January 2018 that speed limit compliance had increased from 2 in 5 to 99 in 100 drivers.

A short stretch of the A90, from the southern terminus of the M90 to Barnton Junction (a junction with the A902), is part of Euroroute E15, which runs from Inverness to Algeciras in Spain. The E15 continues northwards on the M90, and southwards on the A902 leading to the Edinburgh City Bypass.

The A90 ran along the coast and through Aberdeen until the city was bypassed with the opening of the Aberdeen Western Peripheral Route in 2018. The former stretch of A90 from Stonehaven through to just north of Aberdeen is now part of the A92.

Future
Ground investigations were carried out in 2019 in preparation for upgrading the flat junction between the A90 and the A937 to a flyover after a number of deaths. This followed years of local campaigning. However, in 2021 it was announced that work had been delayed. The proposed flyover would require the closure of a flat crossing at Oatyhill which is now the sole access point to some properties after a nearby bridge crossing the Dundee–Aberdeen line was closed to road traffic in 2020.

River crossings
A90 bridges span numerous rivers, estuaries and burns including:
Carron Water
Cowie Water
Burn of Muchalls
Burn of Pheppie
Burn of Elsick
River Dee
River Don
Ythan Estuary
River Tay
Firth of Forth

See also
 A roads in Zone 9 of the Great Britain numbering scheme
 Causey Mounth
 Aberdeen Western Peripheral Route (AWPR)

References

External links
 A90 Aberdeen Western Peripheral 

Roads in Scotland
Transport in Edinburgh
Transport in Perth and Kinross
Transport in Dundee
Transport in Angus, Scotland
Transport in Aberdeenshire
Transport in Aberdeen